Michael Joseph Stack (September 29, 1888December 14, 1960) was a U.S. Representative from Pennsylvania from 1935 to 1939. His grandson is former Pennsylvania Lieutenant Governor Michael J. Stack III.

Biography
Stack was born in Listowel in County Kerry on the island of Ireland (the entirety of which was then part of the U.K.).  He immigrated to the United States in 1903 and settled in Philadelphia.  He attended St. Josephs College in  Philadelphia and graduated from St. Mary's University in Baltimore, Maryland, in 1910.  He was employed by a railroad company in Detroit, Michigan, from 1910 to 1917. During the First World War, he enlisted on July 17, 1917, as a private in the Medical Detachment, Three Hundred and Sixtieth Infantry. After the war, he became engaged in the real estate business in Philadelphia.

Stack was elected as a Democrat to the Seventy-fourth and Seventy-fifth Congresses.  He was an unsuccessful Democratic candidate for renomination in 1938 and was an unsuccessful Royal Oak candidate for reelection in 1938.  He resumed the real estate business, and died in Philadelphia.  He is interred in St. Denis Cemetery in Havertown, Pennsylvania.

References
 Retrieved on 2009-02-22
The Political Graveyard

External links

1888 births
1960 deaths
Politicians from Philadelphia
People from Listowel
Politicians from County Kerry
American military personnel of World War I
Irish emigrants to the United States (before 1923)
United States Army soldiers
Democratic Party members of the United States House of Representatives from Pennsylvania
20th-century American politicians